Neelambaradhan (born June 12), better known by his stage name Neelan Sekar, is an Indian Film director and Screenwriter, works predominantly in Tamil cinema. He started his career as a dialogue writer for Arinthum Ariyamalum. He made his directing debut with Alibhabha in 2008, with, actor Kreshna in the lead role, produced by Pattiyal Sekhar. His work as a screenwriter includes movies like  Naan, Super Deluxe, Maara and Cobra. He has also co-written Fingertip (web series) produced by Vishnuvardhan in 2019. He received the Best Screenplay Writer award from the Ananda Vikatan Cinema Awards for his work in Super Deluxe along with Thiagarajan Kumararaja, Mysskin, and Nalan Kumarasamy.

Filmography

Awards and nominations

See also
List of accolades received by Super Deluxe (film)#Awards_and_nominations

References

External links 
 

Tamil film directors
21st-century Indian film directors
Tamil screenwriters
Indian male screenwriters
Indian screenwriters
Living people
1976 births
People from Tirunelveli